Star Trek: Nemesis – Music from the Original Motion Picture Soundtrack is a soundtrack album for the 2002 film, Star Trek: Nemesis, composed by Jerry Goldsmith. Released on December 10, 2002 through Varèse Sarabande, the soundtrack features fourteen tracks of score at a running time just over forty-eight minutes, though bootleg versions containing the entire score have since been released. A deluxe edition soundtrack limited to 5000 copies was released on January 6, 2014 by Varèse Sarabande.

It would be Goldsmith's final Star Trek score before his death in 2004.

Track listing

The Deluxe Edition

On January 6, 2014 Varèse Sarabande released an expanded 5000-copy limited edition album of the score entitled Star Trek: Nemesis – The Deluxe Edition. The 2-disc album features many previously unreleased cues as well as source music and alternate cues and mixes. The final track of the album entitled "Director and Composer" provides the audio to the final moments of Goldsmith on the Star Trek scoring stage with his orchestra and director Stuart Baird.

Album cues from the original CD are bolded in the following track listing, though the lengths of several of the original CD cues are different.

Disc 1:

Disc 2:

* - Contains "Theme from Star Trek (TV Series)" by Alexander Courage & Gene Roddenberry
** - Contains "Theme from Star Trek: The Motion Picture" by Jerry Goldsmith
† - Contains "Blue Skies" by Irving Berlin

Personnel
Credits adopted from Allmusic:

Production
Jerry Goldsmith – composer, conductor, producer
Alexander Courage – original material
Gene Roddenberry – original material
Robert Townson – executive producer
Hollywood Studio Symphony – orchestra
Sandy DeCrescent – orchestra contractor
Endre Granat – concertmaster
Lois Carruth – assistant to composer

Orchestration and technical
Conrad Pope – orchestration
Mark McKenzie – orchestration
Nick Vidar – programming
Bruce Botnick – engineer
Norm Dlugatch – assistant engineer
Dominic Gonzalez – assistant engineer
Paul Wertheimer – assistant engineer
Ken Hall – music editor

See also
 List of Star Trek composers and music

References

External links
 Star Trek: Nemesis at Varèse Sarabande
 Star Trek: Nemesis Soundtracks

Music based on Star Trek
2002 soundtrack albums
Science fiction soundtracks
Science fiction film soundtracks